Welcome to the Show was a 2011 South Korean television sitcom that aired on SBS. It starred Lim Seul-ong, Sulli, Nichkhun, Kim Jang-hoon, and Kim Kwang-kyu. SBS's real life show Inkigayo serves as the backdrop to the show.

Synopsis
The sitcom shows the behind-the-scenes action of idol singers, studio artists, managers and producers on SBS's Inkigayo. The show drew its stories from idols, seniors, juniors, managers, and producers that actually run Inkigayo.

Sulli and Nickhun are supposedly dating and seem like they are very much in the honeymoon phase. Seulong likes Sulli as well, but cannot do anything about it due to the fact that he believes Sulli and Nickhun are together. During the live recording he tries to incite trouble for Nickhun, much to the dismay of his co-MCs and crew. Meanwhile, the singer Maestro 'Mae' (Kim Jang-hoon), who can be petulant and arrogant, is having his comeback stage after 5 years, but suffers from the lack of respect given to him by juniors. He and his manager (Kim Kwang-kyu), cautious and careful not to anger Mae, have a comedic, but moving tumultuous relationship.

History
On February 14, 2011 SBS revealed that they had Kim Jang-hoon, Kim Kwang-kyu, 2AM's Im Seulong, f(x)'s Sulli Choi, and 2PM's Nichkhun in its upcoming sitcom, which they had started preparing the year before. An SBS representative said, "The new cast had their first recording on the 13th at SBS's Inkigayo studio. There will be a big idol cast with a 'mellow line' between them. Other older actors and singers will also be taking part. Although the broadcast date hasn't been finalized yet, we’re aiming for a March release." The producers also revealed that though the show was being prepared as a series that they will observe viewer responses after the pilot airs before making any final decisions.

On March 9, SBS confirmed that TVXQ, IU, BEAST, and other idol singers would be making appearances. It was later revealed that day that the show would air on March 16. On March 14, SBS released a teaser for the show.

The pilot aired on March 16, 2011. Due to poor ratings the show was scrapped despite viewers liking the new concept.

Cast

Main cast
Lim Seul-ong as Seulong
Sulli as Sulli
Nichkhun as Nickhun
Kim Jang-hoon as Maestro, a singer
Kim Kwang-kyu as manager
Park Gwang-hyun as PD
Lee Hae-in as assistant director
Kim Kyung-jin as FD
Lee Ji-eun as herself
Krystal as herself
Yoon Gi-won as manager of 2AM & Oska (Secret Garden)
Seo Hyun-chul as technical director

Cameos
Jung Yun-ho
Shim Chang-min
Lee Jung
Seungho, G.O, and Thunder of MBLAQ
Junhyung and Yang Yo-seob of BEAST
Dal Shabet
INFINITE
Jewelry
ZE:A
G.NA

Stellar, Eric Mun of Shinhwa, Teen Top, and Girls' Generation appear briefly while performing.

Music
"Hana Yori Dango Returns Main Theme" by Yamashita Kosuke
"Yayaya" by T-ARA
"BTD" by INFINITE
"Keep Your Head Down" by TVXQ
"Can't Let You Go Even If I Die" by 2AM
"Hoot" by Girls' Generation

Ratings

References

External links
Official website

Seoul Broadcasting System television dramas
2011 South Korean television series debuts
2011 South Korean television series endings
Korean-language television shows